The Petchey Academy is an academy, located on the site of the former Kingsland School in the London Borough of Hackney, where its LEA is The Learning Trust.

Named after businessman, philanthropist, and former football club director and owner Jack Petchey who sponsored the academy, It is a comprehensive high school and sixth form for boys and girls aged from 11 to 18.

The academy contains six houses: Darzi, Hunt, Jenner, Saunders, Seacole and Yacoub; all named after famous figures in the field of medicine.

The academy is non-denominational and offers five subject categories. These are: Core (English, mathematics and science), Human Spirit (History, Sociology, Religious Studies) Wider World (Geography and Foreign Languages), Society and The Arts (Music, Drama, Art), and Enterprise and Innovation (Food Technology, Business, DT, PE, Computing).

The Petchey Academy's uniform is a black blazer with blue accenting, white shirt, blue tie with a single coloured strip (corresponds to the student's house), black socks, black shoes and black trousers, with a tartan skirt option for girls.

The Academy has gained a number of awards including ECM Gold, Inclusion Award and National Healthy School Status.

History 
Established in 2006, The Petchey Academy was created with the aim of addressing poor education standards in Inner London. The school was created with the aid of a sponsorship by Jack Petchey.

References 

Academies in the London Borough of Hackney
Educational institutions established in 2006
Secondary schools in the London Borough of Hackney
2006 establishments in England
Dalston